AIRS may refer to:

 Atmospheric Infrared Sounder, a weather and climate instrument flying on NASA's Aqua satellite
 Advanced Inertial Reference Sphere, a guidance system designed for use in the LGM-118A Peacekeeper ICBM
 Artificial Intelligence and Robotics Society, an association for students interested in Robotics, Electronics, Mechanics, and Artificial Intelligence
 Put on airs a phrase describing a person who behaves as if they are better than other people

See also
Air (disambiguation)